Lieutenant-General Sir Richard Armstrong, KCB (c. 1782 – 3 March 1854) was an officer in the British Army.

Military career
Armstrong was the only son of Lt.-Col. Richard Armstrong of Lincoln. Armstrong was commissioned as an ensign in 1796. He served in the Peninsular War and in the First Anglo-Burmese War. He became commander of the British forces in Canada West in 1842 and, after serving in that post until 1848, went on to be Commander-in-Chief of the Madras Army in 1851. He resigned due to poor health in early 1854 and died shortly afterwards. He was also colonel of the 95th Regiment of Foot and then colonel of the 32nd Regiment of Foot.

References

 

|-

|-

1780s births
1854 deaths
British Army lieutenant generals
British Army personnel of the Napoleonic Wars
British military personnel of the First Anglo-Burmese War
Knights Commander of the Order of the Bath
People from Lincoln, England
People of British North America
19th-century British Army personnel